Operation Buster–Jangle was a series of seven (six atmospheric, one cratering) nuclear weapons tests conducted by the United States in late 1951 at the Nevada Test Site. Buster–Jangle was the first joint test program between the DOD (Operation Buster) and Los Alamos National Laboratories (Operation Jangle). As part of Operation Buster, 6,500 troops were involved in the Operation Desert Rock I, II, and III exercises in conjunction with the tests. The last two tests, Operation Jangle, evaluated the cratering effects of low-yield nuclear devices. This series preceded Operation Tumbler–Snapper and followed Operation Greenhouse.

US ground forces involvement 
Four U.S. Army units took part in the Operation Buster–Jangle "Dog" test for combat maneuvers after the detonation of a nuclear weapon took place. These units consisted of:
 1st Battalion 188th Airborne Infantry Regiment 11th Airborne Division
 3rd Medical Platoon 188th Airborne Medical Company
 Platoon Company A 127th Engineer Battalion
 Battery C 546th Field Artillery Battalion
Personnel were instructed to create foxholes and construct gun emplacements and bunkers in a defensive position 11 km south of the detonation area. After the nuclear bomb was detonated, the troops were ordered to move forward towards the affected area. While traveling closer to ground zero, troops witnessed the nuclear weapon's effects on the fortifications that were placed in the location in preparation for the tests. The ground troops got as close as 900 meters from ground zero before they were instructed to move out of the area. The Human Resources Research Office was tasked with gathering data on the psychological experiences of the troops after witnessing such a detonation and moving closer towards the affected area.

Radiation protection standards 
For the Operation Buster–Jangle series of tests, the Atomic Energy Commission created a set of criteria that must be followed if exposing armed forces, or civilians to the harmful effects of ionizing radiation.
 Orientation and proper radiological training
 Dispersion of dosimeters amongst personnel
 Utilization of radiological protective equipment and clothing
 Active monitoring of radiological levels
 Briefing of personnel taking part in the exercise
 Decontamination of radioactive debris
A majority of the personnel that took part in the exercise received around 3 R, with pilots receiving an average of 3.9 R. These estimates vary given the differing data provided by the Department of Defense over the years.

References

External links
 

Explosions in 1951
Buster-Jangle
1951 in military history
1951 in Nevada
1951 in the environment
October 1951 events in the United States
November 1951 events in the United States